Morclofone is a cough suppressant.

References 

Antitussives
4-Morpholinyl compunds
Phenol ethers
Benzophenones
Chloroarenes